Royal Opera or Royal Opera House may refer to:
 Khedivial Opera House, Cairo, Egypt; burnt down in 1971
 Royal Swedish Opera, opera house and opera company in Sweden
 L'Opéra of the Palace of Versailles or L'Opéra Royal de Versailles, France
 Opéra Royal de Wallonie, opera house in Liège, Belgium
 Royal Opera House (Mumbai), disused opera house in India
 Royal Opera House Muscat, opera house in Muscat, Oman
 Royal Opera House, Valletta, opera house in Malta
 Royal Opera House, opera house in Covent Garden, London, home of
 The Royal Opera, leading opera company in England
 Royal Wanganui Opera House, opera house in New Zealand
 Royal Opera House, Scarborough, England (1876-2004)

Formerly "Royal" opera houses or companies
 Berlin State Opera, Germany: "Royal Opera House", 1843–1918
 Hungarian State Opera House, Budapest: "Hungarian Royal Opera House", 1884–1945?
 Kroll Opera House, Berlin, Germany: "New Royal Opera Theatre", 1895–1924
 Palace Theatre, London, London: "Royal English Opera House", 1891–92
 Teatro dell'Opera di Roma, Italy: "Royal Opera House", 1926–46

See also
 Live at Royal Opera House, 2002 DVD by Björk
 Teatro Real, a major "Royal" opera house in Madrid, closed 1925–1997
 Royal Theatre (disambiguation)
 Theatre Royal (disambiguation)